Anthony Christmas is an English drummer who has played with Lionsheart, Kinky Machine, Rialto, and Ambershades.

References 

Living people
English drummers
British male drummers
Year of birth missing (living people)